The Hampshire flag is the flag of the English county of Hampshire. It was registered with the Flag Institute on 12 March 2019.



Design
The flag of Hampshire, conceived by Jason Saber and further refined by Brady Ells, retains the rose and crown pattern used in the county for several centuries in various guises. In 1992 the local county council received a formal grant of arms that included a gold royal crown on a red field, over a red rose on a gold field. Wishing to avoid using the restricted royal symbol of the crown on the council flag, Jason Saber replaced the "royal crown" with a specifically Saxon crown. This is also a reference to the county's association with the era of Alfred the Great and his capital of Winchester. Such a crown also appears in the full achievement of arms used by the council, symbolising exactly the same Alfredian legacy as intended in this flag. The red and white double Tudor rose is inspired by the double rose on the “Arthurian” table in the Great Hall in Winchester.

Notably, the bottom sepal of the rose on the Hampshire flag points down, the same way round as the Yorkshire Rose. This represents it being Southampton's shire, in contrast to the rose on the flag of Northamptonshire which points up, the same way as the Lancashire Rose does. However, the Council flags' rose point upwards.

The flag was officially added to the Flag Institute's registry of flags on 12 March 2019 after receiving support from Hampshire County Council, the Lord Lieutenant of Hampshire, and many local organisations.

As well as the red-yellow bicolour flag flown on formal occasions, the council also flies a blue banner with the council logo as "daily" flag.

The county day is 15 July, which is St Swithin's Day. St Swithin was an Anglo-Saxon bishop of Winchester.

Hampshire Hog

Another flag used in the county, created by Mike Jacobs, reflects Hampshire's long held association with the “Hampshire Hog”. The county was the natural habitat of wild boar and became closely associated with the creature, with some of their number being domesticated and contributing to the “Hampshire Pig” and “Wessex Saddleback” breeds. Hampshire people consequently received the soubriquet “Hampshire Hogs” and it has become a popular county motif. The “Hampshire Hog” flag maintains this tradition and is a graphic characterisation of the county, conveying a proud local character.

References

External links
Hampshire Flag Facebook Page
Flag Institute
Hampshire flag page from British County Flags

Hampshire
Hampshire